Cyclone Mahina was the deadliest cyclone in recorded Australian history, and also likely the most intense tropical cyclone ever recorded in the Southern Hemisphere. Mahina struck Bathurst Bay, Cape York Peninsula, Queensland, on 4 March 1899, and its winds and enormous storm surge combined to kill more than 300 people.

This would officially make Mahina the most intense cyclone recorded to have hit the Australian mainland, and the most intense tropical cyclone recorded making landfall anywhere in the world, as well as the most intense tropical cyclone ever recorded in the Southern Hemisphere, a title currently held by Cyclone Winston. Cyclone Mahina also produced the largest storm surge on record, generating a 13-metre (43-foot)-high surge.

Impact

Mahina ranks among the most intense cyclones ever observed in the Southern Hemisphere and almost certainly as the most intense cyclone ever observed off the Eastern states of Australia in recorded history. Clement Lindley Wragge, Government Meteorologist for Queensland, pioneered the naming of such storms and gave this storm its name, Mahina.

Storms of such intensity occur extremely rarely. Scientists identified two other Category 4 or 5 super-cyclones that struck Australia, in the first half of the 19th century, from their effects on the Great Barrier Reef and the Gulf of Carpentaria. This same research shows that on average, such super-cyclones occur in the region only once every two or three centuries.

A pearling fleet, based at Thursday Island, Queensland, was anchored in or near the bay before the storm. Within an hour, the storm drove much of the fleet ashore or onto the Great Barrier Reef; other vessels sank at their anchorages. Four schooners and the manned Channel Rock lightship were lost. A further two schooners were wrecked but later re-floated. The fleets lost 54 luggers, and a further 12 were wrecked but re-floated. People later rescued more than 30 survivors of the wrecked vessels from the shore; however, the storm killed more than 400 people, mostly non-European immigrant crew members. A depiction of the schooner Crest of the Wave in the storm was later sketched in a painting.

Of the  surge, they suggested an incorrectly cited ground level or an involvement of freshwater (rain) flooding. A later study considers this conclusion likely premature and questions the barometer reading as unreliable and not representative of the actual lowest pressure. This subsequent study also examined new evidence of exceptionally high storm surge and inundation.

The cyclone continued southwest over Cape York Peninsula, emerging over the Gulf of Carpentaria, before doubling back and dissipating on 10 March.

Casualties
The exact number of casualties is not known, as many deaths were not recorded. Estimates range between 307 and 410.

In September 1899, the Queensland Marine Department published a list of 247 known fatalities. The Queensland Registry of Births, Deaths and Marriages has 283 registered deaths attributed to the cyclone, including 250 on pearling ships. One of the pearling fleet owners estimated another 30 people not officially registered as crew were killed and not reported to the Cooktown Registrar.

Around 100 Aboriginal Australians were killed but not recorded, as Aboriginal people were not counted as part of the population at the time. They had tried to help shipwrecked men, but the back surge caught them and swept them into the sea. Only eight Aboriginal people were recorded among the casualties, all of whom died on shore.

The Queensland Historical Atlas reported the death toll as "307 pearl divers and sailors and an unreported number of Aborigines".

Aftermath
People found thousands of fish and some sharks and dolphins several kilometres (miles) inland, and the storm embedded rocks into trees. On Flinders Island (Queensland), people found dolphins on the  cliffs; however, this finding does not necessarily indicate a surge of this height; on this exposed site, wave run-up readily can produce these results even within the more modest calculated surge.

At Cape Melville, survivors erected a memorial stone to "The Pearlers" lost to the cyclone, naming 11 Europeans but only citing "over 300 coloured men" for the other seamen. The Anglican church on Thursday Island, Queensland, also commemorates this disaster.

Barometric pressure estimates 

Contemporary reports vary considerably in the reported lowest barometric pressures.

More modern reports of an  observation on a vessel in the eye of Mahina are unrealistic (the most intense tropical cyclone, Typhoon Tip, had a central pressure  higher).

One author accepted the  report from the Olive and the  report from the Crest of the Wave, seemingly unaware of the discrepant reports. He estimated the track of the cyclone from the damage reports, placing it directly over the position of the Crest of the Wave. The Olive to the north missed the centre. The separation between these schooners explains the difference between their respective pressure measurements.

This study considers the apparently third-hand report of  an unreliable measurement made possibly five hours prior to passage of the eye.

Barometric pressure this low at mean sea level also likely caused Cyclone Mahina to create such an intense, phenomenal, claimed world-record storm surge that was not immediately known afterward.

Popular culture 
In 2008, Ian Townsend published The Devil's Eye: a novel as a historical fiction novel based on Cyclone Mahina. The novel was developed as part of his research fellowship at the State Library of Queensland.

See also

 List of disasters in Australia by death toll
 List of tropical cyclones
 List of tropical cyclone records
 1899 Queensland colonial election, which occurred during the same month
 1970 Bhola cyclone – The deadliest tropical cyclone worldwide, on record
 Cyclone Flores – The deadliest tropical cyclone recorded in the Southern Hemisphere
 Cyclone Winston (2016) – The most intense modern tropical cyclone in the Southern Hemisphere

References

Further reading

External links

 
 
 How high was the storm surge from Tropical Cyclone Mahina? by Jonathan Nott, James Cook University, & Matthew Hayne, Australian Geological Survey Organisation
 Video: The 1899 Pearling fleet disaster – an account by Ian Townsend. Created as part of the Queensland Stories project, State Library of Queensland, Australia. (4 minutes; Windows Media Player, RealPlayer)
 Natural disasters in Australia
 Australia's worst cyclone disasters – Queensland State Disaster Management Group

1899
Mahina
1899 meteorology
1899 natural disasters
Mahina
Disasters in Queensland
Far North Queensland
1899 in Australia
March 1899 events
1899 disasters in Australia